Ned Doyle may refer to:

 Dan Doyle (footballer) (1864–1918), known as Ned, Scottish footballer
 James Edwin Doyle (1902–1989), known as Ned, American advertising executive
 Ned Doyle (hurler), Irish hurler